Hermann von Valta (27 August 1900 – 27 November 1968) was a German bobsledder who competed in the 1930s. He won two gold medals in the four-man event at the FIBT World Championships (1934, 1935). Valta also competed at the 1936 Winter Olympics in Garmisch-Partenkirchen, finishing fifth in the two-man event and seventh in the four-man event.

References
Bobsleigh four-man world championship medalists since 1930
Wallenchinsky, David. (1984). "Bobsled". In The Complete Book the Olympics: 1896-1980. New York: Penguin Books. pp. 558, 560.

1900 births
1968 deaths
German male bobsledders
Olympic bobsledders of Germany
Bobsledders at the 1936 Winter Olympics